Furka Pass, with an elevation of , is a high mountain pass in the Swiss Alps connecting Gletsch, Valais with Realp, Uri. The Furka Oberalp Bahn line through the Furka Tunnel bypasses the pass. The base tunnel opened in 1982 and replaced a tunnel at 2100 metres.

The Furka Pass was used as a location in the James Bond film Goldfinger.
One curve on the east side of the pass is even named "James Bond Strasse". At the sign, there is a lookout point with a small parking area. Visitors can also park next to Hotel Belvédère, close to the top of the pass on the west side, and take the short walk to the Rhone Glacier Ice Grotto. The glacier moves 30–40 meters a year and the 100 meter long tunnel and ice chamber can be visited from June when the road opens.

See also
 List of highest paved roads in Europe
 List of mountain passes
 List of the highest Swiss passes

External links 

 
 Furka Cycling Profile, Maps, and Photos
 Furka Cogwheel Steam Railway
 Profile on climbbybike.com
 Cycling up to the Furkapass: data, profile, map, photos and description
 Furka Pass - the world's greatest driving roads - Colcorsa

Mountain passes of the Alps
Mountain passes of Switzerland
Mountain passes of Valais
Mountain passes of the canton of Uri
Tourist attractions in the canton of Uri
Uri–Valais border
Rail mountain passes of Switzerland